Bell Middle/High School is a school in Bell, Florida. It serves more than 700 students spread out in grades 6 through 12. It is part of the Gilchrist County School District. The school has earned an A grade since 2005, with 2012 still pending, and has been rated as one of the top 10 combination middle/high schools in the state of Florida.

Administration
Principal: Ms. Sherry Lindsey
Vice Principal: Mr. Brent Douglas
Vice Principal: Mrs. Lisa Barry

Clubs and activities

21st Century Community Learning Centers
Purple Powerhouse Band
Beta Club
Book Club
Future Business Leaders of America (FBLA)
Fellowship of Christian Athletes (FCA)
Future Farmers of America (FFA)

Hi-Q
Health Occupations Students of America (HOSA)
Junior Reserve Officer Training Corps (JROTC)
Students Working Against Tobacco (SWAT)
Yearbook

Notable accomplishments
Bell High School's Junior Reserve Officers' Training Corps program received the "Honor Unit With Distinction" award for seven years in a row. It is currently run by SAI Col. McGill, AAI 1st Sgt. Mienholtz.

Bell High School is known for is its excellent Criminal Justice program. Each year it participates in the Florida Public Service Association (FPSA) competition and won first place in at state competition in 2010-2011, 2011-2012, and 2012-2013. Several students from Bell Middle/High School serve on the board of the organization as well.

In June 2007 at the 88th Florida FFA State Convention Bell FFA member Jeffrey Lee Williams Jr. was elected and served as the 2007-2008 Area 2 State Vice President. The 1st in over 60 years from the school!

References 

School website

Public high schools in Florida
Schools in Gilchrist County, Florida
Public middle schools in Florida